Rochelle Lisa Martin  (born 28 March 1973) is a former New Zealand rugby union player. She represented  and Auckland. She was a member of the 1998, 2002 and 2006 champion sides.

Martin made her international debut for the Black Ferns on 2 September 1994 against Australia at Sydney. She was also part of the squads that won the Canada Cup in 1996 and 2005, and the 2004 Churchill Cup. At the 1998 Rugby World Cup, she scored two tries against Germany in the Black Ferns record 134–6 victory.

Martin works as a firefighter in Auckland. Earlier in 2014 her home was burglarized and several of her rugby mementos were stolen.

In the 2018 Queen's Birthday Honours, Martin was appointed a Member of the New Zealand Order of Merit, for services to rugby and Fire and Emergency New Zealand.

References

External link
 Black Ferns Profile

1973 births
Living people
New Zealand women's international rugby union players
New Zealand female rugby union players
Female rugby union players
Members of the New Zealand Order of Merit
New Zealand firefighters